The England A cricket team toured Bangladesh in the 2006–07 season and played two unofficial 'test'matches and three List-A matches against the Bangladesh A.

The England A team was captained by Michael Yardy and included well-known players like Stuart Broad, Tim Bresnan, Graham Onions, Matt Prior and Nick Compton.

The England A team won the test series 1-0 and the list A series 2–1.

References

External links
 CricketArchive
 Cricinfo

2007 in English cricket
2006 in English cricket
2006 in Bangladeshi cricket
2007 in Bangladeshi cricket
English cricket tours of Bangladesh